is a city located in Ibaraki Prefecture, Japan. , the city had an estimated population of 73,805 in 29,362 households and a population density of 307 persons per km². The percentage of the population aged over 65 was 32.2%.

Geography
Kasama is located in the central Ibaraki Prefecture, bordering on Tochigi Prefecture to its extreme northwest. Kasama is surrounded by mountains on all sides.

Surrounding municipalities
Ibaraki Prefecture
 Mito
 Ishioka
Sakuragawa
Omitama
Ibaraki
Shirosato
Tochigi Prefecture
Motegi

Climate
Kasama has a humid subtropical climate (Köppen Cfa) characterized by hot summers and mild winters with rare snowfall.

Demographics
Per Japanese census data, the population of Kasama peaked around the year 2000 and has declined slightly since.

History
Kasama was once a castle town  for Kasama Domain and post-station during the Edo period Tokugawa Shogunate. It continued to prosper as a shrine town of Kasama Inari Shrine in the Meiji period (1868–1912). Stone quarrying was its main activity. Utensils for the Japanese tea ceremony, flower vases, and sake containers made from the Kasama ware pottery continued to the economy.
After the Meiji Restoration, the town of Kasama was established with the creation of the modern municipalities system on April 1, 1889, within Nishiibaraki District. The town of Shishido, a former castle town of Shishido Domain, was likewise established within Nishiibaraki District on the same day. In 1955, Shishido merged with the neighboring villages of Kitakawane and Ohara to form the town of Tomobe. Kasama was elevated to city status on August 1, 1958.

On March 19, 2006, Kasama absorbed the towns of Tomobe and Iwama (both from Nishiibaraki District), and the new city hall was located at the former Tomobe Town Hall. Tomobe became the new city's administrative center, since it was more populous than the former Kasama town.

The former town of Iwama is known for having been the residence of Ueshiba Morihei, founder of Aikido, from 1942 until his death. Popular singer and songwriter Sakamoto Kyu also lived in Kasama as a child.  Twice daily, chimes announce the time of day to the tune of his songs. His song "Ue o muite arukō" also plays at Tomobe train station to announce departures.

Government
Kasama has a mayor-council form of government with a directly elected mayor and a unicameral city council of 22 members. Kasama contributes two members to the Ibaraki Prefectural Assembly. In terms of national politics, the city is split between the Ibaraki 1st district and the Ibaraki 2nd district of the lower house of the Diet of Japan.

Economy
Kasama has a mixed industrial base of light manufacturing and food processing. The main agricultural crops are rice and chestnuts. The area is also famous for stone quarrying of a form of granite called mikage-ishi, widely used in construction and for grave stones.

Education
Kasama has ten public elementary schools and five public middle schools operated by the city government, and two public high schools operated by the Ibaraki Prefectural Board of Education.

Transportation

Railway
 JR East – Jōban Line
 - 
 JR East –  Mito Line
 -  -  -  -

Highway
  – Iwama Interchange, Tomobe Junction
  – Kasama-Nishi Interchange, Kasama Parking Area, Tomobe Interchange, Tomobe Junction

Local attractions
Ruins of Kasama Castle
Kasama Inari Shrine, one of the main Inari shrines in Japan
Shofuku-ji, one of the Bandō Sanjūsankasho temples
Shishido Jin’ya
Kasama Nichido Museum of Art (笠間日動美術館) which opened on November 11, 1972 houses a collection which includes Degas, Van Gogh, and Warhol.  
Ibaraki Prefectural Ceramics Museum
Kasama-yaki ceramics 
The house of calligrapher and ceramicist Kitaoji Rosanjin (北大路魯山人) is located in Kasama, and it has become a museum.

Notable people from Kasama 
Morihiro Saito, aikido teacher
Kimura Buzan, Nihonga painter
Nasa Hataoka, professional golfer
Yamashita Rin, female icon painter
Zatoichi, fictional blind masseuse swordsman

References

External links

Official website 

 
Cities in Ibaraki Prefecture